Khan Abdul Ali Khan (20 August 1922 – 19 February 1997) was a Pakistani educationist, former Principal of Islamia College Peshawar, The FazleHaq College Mardan, Aitchison College, former Vice Chancellor of Peshawar University, Gomal University and former Education Secretary of NWFP.

Biography 
Born into a political family, Abdul Ali Khan was the youngest son of Abdul Ghaffar Khan (Bacha Khan). He remained apolitical in his whole life. He was educated in Colonel Brown Cambridge School in Dehradun and completed his bachelor's degree from Peshawar University, before travelling to England to complete his postgraduate studies from the University of Oxford. He returned to Peshawar where he worked as a lecturer in history in Islamia College Peshawar. He subsequently served as Principal of Government college of Mianwali and Sargodha and was the principal of the elite Aitchison College Lahore from 1962 to 1970 before being appointed secretary education (1970–1972) in the North-West Frontier Province. He was then appointed Vice-Chancellor of Peshawar University and Gomal University. Eventually moving on to serve as Education secretary again before being appointed Principal of the newly established Fazle Haq College Mardan. He was a recipient of the Sitara-e-Imtiaz in 1997. He died in 1997 following a myocardial infarction.

References

External links
 Aitchison College former Principcals

Pashtun people
Pakistani educators
1997 deaths
1922 births
Academic staff of Aitchison College
Academic staff of the University of Peshawar
Bahram Khan family
Academic staff of Islamia College University
University of Peshawar alumni
Alumni of the University of Oxford